The British Cycling Premier Calendar Road Race Series is a season-long competition run by British Cycling. It comprises a series of road bicycle races for the country's top domestic road riders.

Organisation and events
In 2010 points were awarded for the first 20 places in each single day road race and for the top 20 overall in stage races as follows: 100, 85, 75, 66, 58, 51, 45, 39, 34, 29, 25, 21, 18, 15, 12, 10, 8, 6, 4, 2. For each stage of a stage race (including prologues) the top 15 riders are awarded points as follows: 30, 25, 21, 17, 14, 12, 10, 8, 7, 6, 5, 4, 3, 2, 1. Nowadays the series includes an award for the highest placed U23 rider in the final overall standings. Riders may have up to 10 counting races.

The 2013 series consists of six races:

 27 – 28 April, Tour of the Reservoir
 12 May, Lincoln Grand Prix
 30 June, Beaumont Trophy
 7 July, Stockton Festival of Cycling
 14 July, GP of Wales
 28 July, Ryedale GP

History 
The series was called The Star Trophy until 1975 when it became The Pernod Star Trophy to reflect new sponsorship. It reverted to the name Star Trophy in 1983. It was renamed The Premier Calendar in 1993. In 2014 it became known as the Elite Road Series.

Results

External links
Cycling Archives
British Cycling Web site
Premier Calendar Archives

References

Men's road bicycle races
Recurring events established in 1959
Cycle races in the United Kingdom
Cycle racing series